Ifigeneia Georgantzi (born 17 August 2000) is a Greek footballer who plays as a midfielder for Cypriot club Lefkothea Latsion and the Greece women's national team.

Club career
Mentekas Kalamarias(GR),Aris Ladies(GR),Lefkothea Latsion(CY).

Awards 
«PASP BEST11 WOMEN’S AWARDS 2020/21»

International career 
Georgantzi capped for Greece at senior level during the UEFA Women's Euro 2022 qualifying.

References 

2000 births
Living people
Greek women's footballers
Women's association football midfielders
Greece women's international footballers
Greek expatriate women's footballers
Greek expatriate sportspeople in Cyprus
Expatriate women's footballers in Cyprus